Fanafjorden is a fjord in the city-municipality of Bergen in Vestland county, Norway. The fjord is located between the small Krokeide peninsula (on the south) and the village area of Milde in Ytrebygda, and forms a natural boundary between the city boroughs of Fana and Ytrebygda. The urban area of Fanahammeren lies at the eastern end of the fjord.

References

Geography of Bergen
Fjords of Vestland